Norendoxifen, also known as 4-hydroxy-N,N-didesmethyltamoxifen, is a nonsteroidal aromatase inhibitor (AI) of the triphenylethylene group that was never marketed. It is an active metabolite of the selective estrogen receptor modulator (SERM) tamoxifen. Unlike tamoxifen, norendoxifen is not a SERM, and instead has been found to act as a potent and selective competitive inhibitor of aromatase (Ki = 35 nM). Drugs with dual SERM and AI activity, such as 4'-hydroxynorendoxifen, have been developed from norendoxifen, and may have therapeutic potential as antiestrogens in the treatment of estrogen receptor-positive breast cancer.

See also
 Afimoxifene (4-hydroxytamoxifen)
 Endoxifen (4-hydroxy-N-desmethyltamoxifen)

References

Amines
Aromatase inhibitors
Hormonal antineoplastic drugs
Human drug metabolites
Phenols
Triphenylethylenes